Laima is a Latvian and Lithuanian female given name, which means "luck" or "beginning". Laima is the goddess of fate and birth in Baltic mythologies. The name may refer to:

Laima Adlytė (born 1971), Lithuanian draughts player
Laima Andersone-Silāre (born 1929), Latvian opera singer
Laima Andrikienė (born 1958), Lithuanian politician
Laima Bernatavičiūtė (born 1985), Lithuanian handballer
Laima Muktupāvela (born 1962), Latvian author
Laima Vaikule (born 1954), Latvian actress
Laima Zilporytė (born 1967), Lithuanian cyclist

References

Latvian feminine given names
Lithuanian feminine given names